This is a list of national liquors. A national liquor is a distilled alcoholic beverage considered standard and respected in a given country. While the status of many such drinks may be informal, there is usually a consensus in a given country that a specific drink has national status or is the "most popular liquor" in a given nation. This list is distinct from national drink, which include non-alcoholic beverages.

East Asia
 : Baijiu (including Kaoliang liquor) (sorghum, rice, wheat, barley, millet)
 : Kaoliang liquor
 : Sake, Shōchū (including Awamori) (rice, barley, sweet potatoes, buckwheat), Japanese whisky
 : Pyongyang Soju
 : Soju (rice, barley, corn, potato, sweet potato)
 : Kumis (Airag)

Europe
 : Rakia
 : Inländer Rum & schnapps (fruit)
 : Krambambula
 : Jenever (malt and Juniper)
 : Rakija (fruit: apples, plums, pears)
 : Rakia (grapes, apricots, plums)
 : Rakija (fruit: plums, pears) and Pelinkovac
 : Zivania (wine or grape residue left over from winemaking) and Commandaria (sweet dessert wine)
 : Becherovka (herbs) or Slivovice (plums)
 : Akvavit (grain or potatoes)
 : Vana Tallinn
 : Koskenkorva Viina (grain (barley) and Finlandia vodka (barley)
 : Calvados (apple brandy from Normandy); Armagnac and Cognac, Pastis
 : Schnapps (fruit) (in the South), Korn (in the North)
: Raki (Ρακί ή Ρακή), produced from fruit. Ouzo (distilled 96 percent pure ethyl alcohol and Anise). Crete: Tsikoudia (pomace raki). Mainland Greece: Tsipouro (pomace raki)
 : Unicum (herbs), Pálinka (fruit), Tokaji 
 : Brennivín, aka “Black Death” (potatoes)
 : Irish Whiskey (fermented mash of cereal grains), Poitín (malted barley grain)
 : Grappa (pomace and grape residue left over from winemaking), Limoncello, Amaretto, Amaro, Fernet, Mirto, Alchermes, Aperol, Campari, Cynar, Frangelico, Maraschino, Rosolio, Sambuca, Strega
 : Riga Black Balsam
 : Midus 
 : Rakija and Mastika (Typically, red and/or white grapes. Plums used in some areas such as Kichevo.  Mastika is anise and herb flavored rakija)
 : Rakija (Loza), produced from red grapes
 : Jenever (Malt and Juniper)
 : Akevitt (must be distilled from Norwegian potatoes and aged for a minimum of six months in oak casks to be labeled "Norwegian Akevitt", unlike Danish and Swedish akvavit, which is commonly grain-based and unaged)
 : Nalewka, Krupnik, Vodka (grain, rye, wheat, potatoes, or sugar beet Molasses), and, during the era of the Polish-Lithuanian Commonwealth, mead
 : Madeira wine, Port wine, Ginjinha, Jeropiga, Licor Beirão, Bitter almond liqueur and Madeiran rum.
 : Ţuică (plums) or Pălincă (fruit)
 : Vodka (grain, rye, wheat, potatoes, or sugar beet molasses)
 : Rakija (šljivovica in particular)
 : Slivovica, Borovička (juniper berries)

 : Sherry (brandy-fortified Spanish wine)
 Navarre: Patxaran
 : Brännvin, Akvavit, Snaps and Punsch
 : Absinthe, Goldschläger, Pflümli, Poire Williams, Kirsch
 : Rakı (twice-distilled Suma and Anise)
 : Horilka (Ukrainian vodka), Hrenovuha
 :
  : Gin (south) Whisky (north) 
  : Irish Whiskey
  : Scotch Whisky, particularly Single malt whisky is considered the national drink of Scotland.
  : Welsh Whisky
: Manx Spirit

Ibero America and Caribbean
 : Wine, fernet con coca (cocktail), hesperidina (apéritif)
 : Rum (sugarcane molasses)
 : Rum (sugarcane molasses)
 : Singani (muscat grapes)
 : Cachaça (sugarcane)
 : Pisco (grapes; in contention with Peru)
 : Aguardiente
 : Guaro (sugarcane)
 : Rum (sugarcane molasses)
 : Rum and Mamajuana
 : Aguardiente (sugarcane)
 : Guaro (sugarcane)
 French West Indies: Rum (sugarcane)
 : Rum, and Cusha
 : Rum, and Clairin (sugarcane)
 : Guaro
 : Rum (sugarcane)
 : Tequila (blue agave), Mezcal, Pulque, and Brandy
 : Rum (sugarcane)
 : Seco Herrerano (sugarcane)
 : Caña blanca (sugarcane)

 : Pisco (grapes; in contention with Chile)
 : Pitorro, Rum
 : Rum (sugarcane)
 : Grappamiel (grape pommace, honey), Grappa (grape pommace, originally Italian), espinillar (sugar cane)
 : Rum (sugarcane), Miche andino (brown sugar) and cocuy (agave cocui)

Northern America
 : Rum 
 : Canadian Whisky
 : Bourbon Whiskey

Oceania
 : Bundaberg Rum

South Asia

 : vodka and brandy from Carew, toddy (palm wine) (pronounced tari in Bengali)
 : Rum (Old Monk), Feni (Cashew or coconut), Toddy (palm wine), tharra, Chandr Haas 
 : Raksi, Chhaang
 : coconut Arrack, coconut Toddy and Palm Toddy

Southeast Asia

 : Sombai infused rice wine
 : Arak (Bali), Tuak (Sumatra & Java), Moke (Flores), Sopi (Ambon & Nusa Tenggara), Cap Tikus (Manado), Ballo (Toraja), Swansrai (Papua)
 : Lao-Lao is a Laotian rice whisky produced in Laos. Along with Beerlao, lao-Lao is a staple drink in Laos.
 : Tuak
 : Lambanog
 : Lao Khao, Sato, Mekhong whiskey (95% sugarcane/molasses and 5% rice), Mekhong, Namtanmao, Sang Som
 : Rượu đế (glutinous or non-glutinous rice) and Rượu thuốc (herbs and raw animals)

West Asia

 : Oghi
 : Chacha
 : Aragh sagi and Shiraz wein
 : Arak, Tubi 60
 : Arak
 : Arak (Anise)
 Levant: Arak
 : Arak
 : Arak (Anise)

See also

 Alcoholic beverage
 Distilled beverage
 Ethanol
 Liqueur
 List of alcoholic beverages
 List of cocktails
 List of liqueurs
 List of national drinks
 List of vodkas
 List of whisky brands
 National dish

References

Further reading
 

Alcohol-related lists

Lists of drinks
Liquors